Fall from the Sky may refer to:

Fall from the Sky (album), 2006 album by Melissa Greener
"Fall from the Sky" (song), 2019 song by Arilena Ara representing Albania in the Eurovision Song Contest 2020

See also
Things That Fall from the Sky, a collection of short stories by Kevin Brockmeier